Itseng Kgomotso is a beauty queen who represented Botswana in Miss World 2008 in South Africa.  She studied for a degree in arts in the University of Botswana. In July 2010 she was the second princess at the Miss Universe Botswana beauty pageant. In October 2010 she won the Toyota Kickoff Soccerbabes model search, becoming the first citizen of Botswana to ever win the competition.

References

1989 births
Living people
Miss World 2008 delegates
Botswana beauty pageant winners
University of Botswana alumni